Ranveig Hjørdis Frøiland (15 September 1945 – 16 March 2020) was a Norwegian politician for the Labour Party. She was Minister of Industry and Energy (energy affairs) in 1996, and Minister of Petroleum and Energy in 1997. Later she served as Chairman of the Board of the Bergen Health Trust.

References

1945 births
2020 deaths
Petroleum and energy ministers of Norway
Members of the Storting
Labour Party (Norway) politicians
21st-century Norwegian politicians
20th-century Norwegian politicians